Garching-Hochbrück is a Munich U-Bahn station in Hochbrück on the U6.  It opened on October 28, 1995.

See also
List of Munich U-Bahn stations

References

External links

Munich U-Bahn stations
Railway stations in Germany opened in 1995
Garching bei München